Der Reka Cipriani (born 6 June 1943) is an Italian fencer. She competed in the women's team foil event at the 1972 Summer Olympics, placing fourth.

References

External links
 

1943 births
Living people
Italian female fencers
Olympic fencers of Italy
Fencers at the 1972 Summer Olympics
20th-century Italian women
21st-century Italian women